James Brown (c.1819 – 12 September 1877) was a New Zealand engraver, caricaturist and drawing tutor. He was born in Linlithgow, West Lothian, Scotland on c.1819.

References

1819 births
1877 deaths
Scottish emigrants to New Zealand
New Zealand cartoonists